Grant Connell and Patrick Galbraith were the defending champions, but lost in the quarterfinals this year.

Tommy Ho and Brett Steven won the title, defeating Gary Muller and Piet Norval 6–4, 7–6 in the final.

Seeds
The top four seeds received a bye into the second round.

Draw

Finals

Top half

Bottom half

Qualifying

Qualifying seeds

Qualifiers

Qualifying draw

First qualifier

Second qualifier

References
 Official results archive (ATP)
 Official results archive (ITF)

1995 ATP Tour
1995 Newsweek Champions Cup and the State Farm Evert Cup